Ben Asher is a Jewish surname meaning "son of Asher".

Aaron ben Moses ben Asher - a 10th-century scribe who refined the Tiberian system for writing down vowel sounds in Hebrew
Aaron ben Asher of Karlin - a 19th-century Hassidic Rabbi in Russia
Aryeh Leib ben Asher Gunzberg - an 18th-century eastern European Rabbinical casuist often referred to by the name of his most famous book, Shaagas Aryeh
Bahya ben Asher - a 14th-century Aragonese rabbi and Kabbalist
Haim Ben-Asher - a member of the Knesset
Jacob ben Asher - a 14th-century German and Spanish rabbi
Judah ben Asher - a 14th-century German and Spanish rabbi

See also
Asher (name)

Hebrew-language surnames
Jewish surnames
Patronymic surnames
Surnames from given names